Catherine "Cathy" E. Foster (born 28 February 1956) is a British sailor. She competed in the 470 event at the 1984 Summer Olympics where she was the only female sailor to qualify and compete. She finished 2nd in the open 420 World Championships and won two Women's World Championship titles but sailing didn't introduce female specific events till the 1988 Olympic Games. She went on into olympic and paralympic sailing coaching and campaigned towards the 2004 Olympic Games.

References

External links
 

1956 births
Living people
English female sailors (sport)
420 class sailors
470 class sailors
World champions in sailing for Great Britain
Olympic sailors of Great Britain
Sailors at the 1984 Summer Olympics – 470
People from Frimley